This is an episode guide for the film series Heimat created by Edgar Reitz.

Heimat
Starting with episode two, there is an introductory narration by Glasisch-Karl who recaps events during and between the previous episodes, using snapshots of the main characters to jog viewers' memories.

1: "The Call of Faraway Places"/"Fernweh" (1919-1928) 

After serving in World War 1, Paul Simon returns home to his family in the (fictional) rural village of Schabbach in the hills and mountains of the Hunsrück Province of the Rhineland-Palatinate. There to welcome him are Paul's parents, Mathias Simon and Katharina (née Schirmer), and his brother and sister, Pauline and Eduard. Eduard did not fight in the war, he has  a bad lung and his mother is very protective of him. Also there is Paul's cousin, Glassich-Karl, also a veteran. He was sent home earlier with a disfiguring skin condition caused by poison gas. Because of his appearance Glassich-Karl will never be a full participant in village life. This gives him something of the perspective of an outsider and he will gradually become the narrator of the series. Paul's first act on returning home was to strike an iron in the family forge. But although brought up in the family trade as a blacksmith, Paul no longer feels at home in Schabbach. He seeks wider horizons and is determined instead to pursue his passion for radio communications in every spare moment.

The most prominent citizen in Schabbach is its avaricious mayor, Alois Wiegand. Wiegland flaunts his purchase of the first motorcycle in the village, exciting the envy and wonderment of the inhabitants. Wiegand's children Maria and Wilfried both will become major characters in the series. The kind and long-suffering Maria Wiegand, in fact, will take over from Paul as the character around whom everything revolves. Wilfried, on the other hand, takes after his unpleasant father.

In 1922 Paul's brother Eduard helps organize the unveiling of Schabbach's war memorial to its fallen sons. The following year the French army occupies the region.  Ruhr Valley. 

Meanwhile Paul has become attracted to Apollonia, a strikingly beautiful girl employed as a maid at the inn. The women of Schabbach, including Paul's mother Katharina, whisper that because she has black hair, Apollonia is gypsy who casts spells on men. The locals hate Apollonia because she has had a child with a Frenchman. Since Apollonia lets no one see her baby, village gossip accuses her of having killed and buried it in the midden (dung heap). They organize a search but instead of a corpse unearth Wiegland's lost motorcycle, missing for a year. Unable to bear their cruelty, Apollonia leaves with her baby for France. After learning that Apollonia returns his love, Paul, smitten, almost goes with her, but is unable to summon up the courage.

Still pining for Apollonia, Paul marries Wiegand's pretty daughter Maria, who has kept in touch with Apollonia and who is also in love with Paul. They have two sons: Anton and Ernst. To support them Paul works at his father Mathias's forge. They live at the forge with Paul's parents.

Paul's sister and brother, Pauline and Eduard, visit the neighboring town of Simmern. While Pauline gazes at the window of a jewelry shop, stones are thrown at the apartment above it, which is owned by a Jew. A shard of glass pierces Pauline's hand, and the jeweler-watchmaker, Robert Kröber, who has been watching from inside, extracts it. That evening, Pauline's hand becomes dangerously infected. Her mother, Katharina, cures it with a home remedy involving soaking it in hot water. During her delirium, Pauline raves about finding a lump of gold. Pauline and the watchmaker fall in love and later marry.

1927, Eduard and his boon companions, his cousin Glasisch-Karl and the bell ringer Glockzieh, become obsessed with panning for gold in nearby streams. They find a shiny pebble and take it to Eduard's brother-in-law, Robert Kröber, for testing, but it turns out to be only copper oxide. Nevertheless the trio persist in believing that gold abounds the mountains and streams of the Hunsrück.

Shortly after this, a group of women picking berries finds the naked body of a murdered woman, and Paul, who happens to be nearby, is assigned to watch it while they summon the police. 

Mathias asks Paul to make a trap to catch a pine marten that has been killing the family's hens. The following day Paul sets off for a beer but instead just keeps walking and disappears, abandoning his family, seemingly forever.

2: "The Centre of the World"/"Die Mitte der Welt" (1929-1933) 

Episode two and those following are introduced by Glasisch-Karl who recaps events using snapshots of the main characters to jog viewers' memories.

We see Paul's arrival at Ellis Island in New York, while back home in Schabbach, Maria is devastated by Paul's departure. When the townswomen rush to inform her that the murdered woman's blood-soaked clothes have been found in the woods, she sobs angrily that Paul had nothing to do with the victim. The pine marten is caught in the trap Paul had made.

Meanwhile, Eduard's feverish panning for gold in the freezing cold streams of the Hunsrück causes his lung condition to worsen dangerously. His father Mathias sells one of his fields so Eduard can travel to a Berlin clinic to be operated on. During his convalescence in Berlin, Eduard, now cured, wanders into a brothel, where the irrepressible madam, Lucie Hardtke, takes a fancy to him. Ever the optimist, Lucie chooses to believe that Eduard belongs to a wealthy landed family, and he doesn't contradict her. They marry and travel by car together to the Hunsrück. As they approach Schabbach, Eduard, wishing to delay the revelation of his family's poverty, stops the car so they can get out while he shows her the beloved woods, fields, and streams of his childhood, his true (if immaterial) treasure. He hopes by this to soften Lucie's disappointment when she confronts the dreary provincial reality of his family home.

Pauline, now married to the watchmaker Robert Kröber and living in Simmern, returns to Schabbach to visit her parents, Mathias and Katharina, in her new automobile and fashionable clothes; for the hard times are now over and people are buying watches and jewelry. Eduard and Lucie arrive soon after. Although initially crestfallen, the indomitable Lucie quickly rallies and begins to plot out a grand future career for Eduard since the newly installed Nazi Party has promised that opportunity will henceforth be available for all men of talent regardless of birth. She vows, moreover, to put Schabbach on the map. 

Alois Wiegand, now sporting a Hitler mustache, also views the Nazi party as a means of personal advancement for himself and for his son, Wilfried, whom he dispatches to Berlin to join the SS. Old Katharina Simon, mistrustful of the seeming good times, mutters forebodingly that "It's all on tick [credit)."

With the approach of Hitler's birthday, Alois organizes a public celebration. Katharina, however, refuses to participate. She makes Maria's young son Anton take off his Hitler Youth uniform and swear never again to wear it. Maria quietly approves. Katharina then leaves for the industrial city of Bochum on the  Ruhr to visit her brother, Hans Schirmer, whose birthday falls on same day as Hitler's. There Katharina witnesses the arrest and deportation of her nephew, Fritz Schirmer, a union official and Communist sympathizer. His family is told Fritz is being sent for re-education to a concentration camp in Mühlheim.

No longer understanding the world in which she lives, Katharina returns to Schabbach, bringing with her Fritz's little daughter, Lotti Schirmer, who, on arrival, suddenly collapses, ill with diphtheria. There is an epidemic in the village and many children die, but with skilled nursing, Katharina pulls Lotti through.

3: "The Best Christmas Ever"/"Weihnacht wie noch nie" (1935) 

Pauline and Robert Kröber have since had two children, Gabi and Robertchen. Eduard and Lucie have a young child, Horst.

A new telephone network now connects Schabbach to the outside world. Lucie is disappointed with the village and most of all with her husband's lack of ambition, for Eduard's consuming obsession with photography leaves little room for other interests. Lucie becomes friendly with the district's new Gauleiter, who by coincidence shares the Simon surname and is also interested in photography. To make better use of this new connection, the couple moves to the neighboring village of Rhaunen. Eduard becomes mayor and Lucie commissions a luxurious villa, "with fifty windows", which they pay for with a loan from a bank owned by Jewish people.

The teenaged Hänchen Betz, son of the Schabbach basketmaker, stumbles across a labor camp under construction. Hans is blind in one eye from a childhood accident. A soldier guarding the camp notices this and suggests to Hans that having one eye will help him become a skilled sharpshooter. Hans borrows his father's rifle and gets into serious trouble by using the newly installed ceramic telephone insulators for target practice. Eduard shields him, however, persuading the Nazi officials that Hans's skills will be very useful to his country.

Wilfried Wiegand returns to the Hunsrück, as an SS official. Lucie, sensing that Wilfried has made useful political connections in Berlin, befriends him. She offers the use of her villa as a suitable place for Party bigwigs to stay if they are ever in the region. 

On Christmas Eve, the villagers attend mass, but Alois Wiegland stays home and listens to Horst-Wessel-Lied on the radio.

Wilfried organizes a top-secret meeting of high-ranking Nazi officials at Lucie and Eduard's villa. It is a social triumph for Lucie. The officials, however, are in too much of a hurry to stay for the expensive and elaborate dinner Lucie had prepared for them. Crestfallen at their speedy departure, Lucie begins plotting new strategies to advance Eduard.

4: "The Highway"/"Reichshöhenstraße" (1938) 

Maria and Pauline visit the cinema in Simmern to see the latest movie starring Zarah Leander. They are taken with the fashionable clothes and striking hairstyle of the movie star. When they return to Pauline's house they have a few drinks and playfully try to copy the star's elaborate curls on their own foreheads. Maria, who has hitherto led a completely self-effacing life caring for her two boys and helping her husband's parents, confides to her sister-in-law that she is attracted to Otto Wohlleben, the civil engineer who is supervising the Organisation Todt a road-building crew that is building a highway through the region. 

Robert returns from a jewelry-buying trip. He shows the two women the death's head rings that are very popular with the construction workers. The group, named for Fritz Todt, who was in charge of large-scale civil and military infrastructure construction projects during the Third Reich, was not connected with the  SS death squads, which wore skull ornaments as part of their uniforms. Maria however is instinctively repelled by the rings.  

The kindly Otto and his colleague Fritz Pieritz are lodging with the Simons family. Otto takes an interest in Maria's children and helps Ernst to build a model airplane. One day, Pieritz brings Otto back with his arm in a cast. He has been in an accident and suffered a serious multiple fracture. Maria helps Otto feed himself. Some months later they attend a village dance and declare their love to each other. Old Katharina gives Maria her blessing.

Maria's older son Anton has caught the photography bug from his uncle Eduard, who encourages him. In the Simon barn, using a cheap projector, Anton shows newsreels and films that Eduard has given him.

In nearby Rhaunen, Lucie's old friend Martina arrives in the Hunsrück region from Berlin. The exuberant Martina flirts with the men of the Todt work crew and invites them to a party at Lucie's house. Lucie fears for her and Eduard's reputation if her history with Martina should become a topic of village gossip. She tries to prevent Martina from leaving the villa and going into town. However, Eduard is pleased with the way things have turned out and wishes they could remain just as they are.

5: "Up and Away and Back"/"Auf und davon und zurück" (1938-1939) 

Lucie tragically crashes her car, which kills her visiting parents who become the first people to be buried in the land, without ever having seen it.

Maria and Otto are now together and watch Zarah Leander in Carl Froelich's new film Heimat. Martina flirts with Rudolf Pollach, an apprentice clockmaker staying with Robert and Pauline. Robert leaves home with their car to go to the Western Front as the war needs all vehicles they can find. Robert is not heard from again.

A letter arrives to Schabbach from the Simon-Electric Corporation of Detroit, announcing that Paul is still alive and intends to visit. The family is impressed by his American status, and proudly repeat the company's postage address. Lucie teachers her young son Horst a poem to recite to Paul when he arrives. Maria becomes distraught having learnt about Paul and breaks up with Otto. Otto becomes transferred to Trier, and later loses his job as the Nazi Party has discovered his mother is half-Jewish.

Maria and Anton travel to Hamburg, to greet Paul but he is not allowed to disembark from the ship without proof of his Aryan heritage. Maria telegraphs home and Eduard with Wilfried assisting search local records for evidence. Eduard becomes frantic, worried that the Jewish loan to build his villa will be revealed. Without finding documentation in time, Paul is forced to sail back to America.

Returning home, Maria hears on the radio that Germany has invaded Poland.

6: "The Home Front"/"Heimatfront" (1943) 

With the war turning against the Nazis, Hunsrück men have been called up, leaving the women to manage farmland with the help of French POWs. Katharina feeds two of the men, but Wilfried, now the region's SS commander openly threatens that if she were not family, he would condemn her to higher authorities. She retorts he is not a real man for staying home instead of fighting.

When a RAF plane crashes in the woods, Wilfried takes delight in killing the injured airman. Wilfried informs his superiors that he killed the pilot because he had tried to escape.

Anton is now serving as a cameraman with a propaganda unit heading for the Eastern Front. He sends his pregnant fiancée, Martha, to Schabbach, where she is welcomed by Maria. Mathias is nearly blind, and has trouble seeing his future granddaughter-in-law.

Ernst has joined the Luftwaffe as a trainee, and meets Otto and Pieritz who are now working in a bomb disposal unit. Otto learns that Maria has had their baby who is now a young child, Hermann.

The authorities allow Anton and Martha to marry by proxy over the only phone in the village, which is located at the Wiegand residence. When accompanying Lucie to the church so she can say a prayer for the marriage, Eduard notices a card commemorating Hans, who has perished in Russia. Ernst concludes the marriage celebrations by flying over the village, dropping a bouquet of flowers.

That evening, Lucie holds a reception and Wilfried makes a comment about the Jews going 'up the chimney', which no one understands. Lucie proudly listens to the violinist, while Eduard sits thinking about Hans, whose death has gone unnoticed in the village.

7: "Soldiers and Love"/"Die Liebe der Soldaten" (1944) 

Anton's propaganda unit is detailed to make fake newsreel footage.

The war conflict becomes close to home, with Allied bombers passing over the Hunsrück on a regular basis. When a bomb falls in the neighbourhood and fails to explode, it provides Otto with a reason to visit Schabbach. He meets his young son Hermann for the first time. Otto and Maria spent the night discussing what might have been for them both. The next day however, Otto is killed while attempting to defuse a bomb.

Shortly afterwards, the anti-aircraft battery is destroyed in an air raid, and several locals are wounded or killed, including a boy Lotti fancied.

With the US forces closing in, Lucie and Eduard are forced to give up their home, which becomes the Allied HQ. Lucie however begins to consider the advantages of having the 'Yanks' in their home. Wilfried is a broken man, and later imprisoned due to his involvement in the SS.

8: "The American"/"Der Amerikaner" (1945-47) 

In Berlin, Martina searches for Rudolf Pollack and finds him badly wounded. While she plays a piano in hopes it will keep him conscious, Pollack dies. She dresses in his uniform and deliberately heads out into the street, where she is killed by Soviet soldiers, having been taken for a German soldier.

Ernst has been shot down over France, but is kept hidden by a Frenchman while he recuperates. In Schabbach, things are easier and the village have created a good rapport with their occupiers.

Paul returns to the village in a chauffeur-driven limousine. Paul observes his mother, placing flowers on the grave of his father, Mathias. Walking into the family forge, he clangs the hammer against the anvil. The sound attracts the villagers. Katharina recognises Paul instantly with joy and Glasisch-Karl proudly repeats Paul's corporation postage address once again. Lucie rushes over to make Paul's acquaintance and prompts Horst to recite the poem he was once taught, albeit with minor updates. Maria acts distantly, ambivalent about Paul's arrival. Soon after, a young woman, Klärchen, arrives too, claiming Ernst has sent her and entrusted the family will keep her. Maria disapproves, but lets her stay.

Paul holds a reception in the village hall for his family and friends. Alois shouts insults out of his window to the 'American', Paul, saying he wants nothing to do with him as it was the Americans who imprisoned Wilfried.

Maria denies Paul's request for them to sleep together. When she asks why he left decades before, he is unable to provide a satisfactory answer.

Eduard drives Paul round the region, and they stop at a bar. Unknowingly to them, Ernst sits nearby proudly showing his latest flame diamonds he has attained through various misdemeanours since the war has ended.

Anton arrives home, after walking over five-thousand kilometres home from Russia. Katharina is proud her family are back together, but after reading about political propaganda in the newspaper, she heads upstairs for a nap, but a little while later is discovered to have passed away. Paul is unable to stay for the funeral, and Maria is sceptical about his promises that he will stay in touch with her.

Anton excitedly tells Martha about his ambition to open an optical instruments factory, and the Hunsrück is the perfect place due to its clean country air. From America, Paul provides financial backing for the enterprise.

9: "Little Herman"/" Hermännchen " (1955-56) 

Hermann aims to become the first member of his family to go to University. Wanting to stay in Ernst's large home, teenage Hermann along with his friends, including Clemens Bengardt, cycle to the Rhine. Ernst has acquired a Sikorsky helicopter and is transporting lumber for his father-in-law's sawmills. Outside a carnival by the river bank, Schnüsschen Schneider, teaches Hermann how to kiss. Anton's company has boomed, and many locals, including Lotti, Klärchen and Pieritz, now living in the region, work at his factory. During a festival to celebrate Anton's company and the way it is putting Schabbach on the map, Anton tries to persuade local smaller farmers to sell and join him.

Lotti and Klärchen sing at the festival, and later return drunk to the Simon home. Their bedroom is adjacent through Hermann's, and after he repeatedly enters their room, Lotti tells him to either stay in or out. Lotti remarks he is not little anymore. Hermann stays with them and drinks. Worrying Maria might hear them, they lock their door. In bed together, Hermann touches Klärchen under the covers, she does not object. Hermann starts to masturbate, then Lotti continues for him. Both women talk casually about the evening's activities, and after Hermann climaxes they comfort him, saying it is very natural.

While washing clothes the next morning at the Simon house, Klärchen tells Hermann he was very sweet but must keep it quiet. Hermann starts to fall in love with her, and eventually she responds. He begins writing her songs and poetry and they commence a secret love affair between one another, even though Klärchen is eleven years his senior.

Ernst's marriage collapses and he hopes to borrow money from Anton to further advance his flying ambitions, but Anton refuses.

One day, Lotti discovers Klärchen jumping from the hay loft in the Simon barn, in hope of miscarrying Hermann's baby. Anxious to not get him into trouble, she leaves the village and has an illegal abortion. She tells Hermann that Anton has fired her and she needs to find work elsewhere.

The fragile, but still money hungry Alois and his son, the now middle-aged Wilfriend, released from prison, are both using insecticides on their farm, which is polluting the air around Anton's factory. Anton has an argument with them at their house, and after returning to his factory he meets an angry Hermann who accuses him of driving Klärchen away. Lotti reveals she left by herself. Unable to believe this, Hermann cycles to Koblenz and he and Klärchen go camping in the rain.

After writing frequently, through a go-between, one letter from Klärchen to Hermann gets sent to the Simon House. Maria reads it and learns about their relationship and the abortion. Maria and Anton, furious because Hermann is still a minor, threaten to call the authorities and take legal action if Klärchen ever contacts Hermann again. However, Ernst agrees to be the couple's go-between and on New Year's Eve, Hermann steals Anton's Mercedes and meets Klärchen for a final time.

Enranged by his family's disapproval of his romance with her, Hermann vows to never fall in love again. And that once he legally can, he will leave the Hunsrück all together.

10: "The Front Years"/"Die stolzen Jahre" (1967-1969) 

The town gets colour television, impressing Anton's children Marlies and Hartmut.

Anton's factory gains an international reputation and industrialists from Brussels arrive with a takeover offer of sixty million marks. Needing time to think and unsure on what to do Anton contacts his father Paul, who has since sold his business and is now in Germany at Baden-Baden. Paul has set up a studio with Hermann, who since studying in America, has become a well known composer of electronic music.

Ernst has begun supplying locals more modern windows and doors, to update their homes, convincing them that aluminium and stone would be 'fashionable'. However, he is then selling their traditional wooden doors and furniture to café owners who are seeking retro-looks.

Paul encourages Anton to demand more for his factory and to enjoy his fortune as Paul is himself. Anton is not convinced by Paul's casual say on the situation and approach to power of wealth. Anton announces to his staff he will reject the deal, and sends his secretary, Lotti, to telegraph the industrialists the update.

Anton catches Ernst scouring their family home for heirlooms that he can sell. They both agree, disagreeing with each other's business tactics.

Pauline tries to convince Maria that it is not too late for them to travel the world, and they have enough money saved up. Maria is worried about leaving her cow behind, but later sells it.

Hermann is invited to give a live concert on the national radio. The villagers of Schabbach gather at the inn to listen, as the piece has been inspired by the Hunsrück. The residents show a disinterest, while Glasisch-Karl listens intensely. Maria is also unimpressed, and feels she does not understand her son Hermann even more after he visits her along with two girlfriends.

As the war memorial is removed, Glasisch-Karl reminisces about when it was first installed and Ernst flies over head in his plane.

11: "The Feast of the Living and the Dead"/"Das Fest der Lebenden und der Toten" (1982) 

Glasisch-Karl narrates over a family tree that details the ancestry of the Simon, Wiegard and Schirmer families. In 1949, Eduard and Lucie lost their own son, Horst, who tragically died after discovering a landmine in the forest. They died in 1967 and 1978 respectively. Pauline and Maria never traveled together, and Pauline passed away in 1975. Glasisch-Karl confirms Pauline's suspicions that her husband, Robert died during the war. Maria's father and brother, Alois and Wilfried have also since died. Lotti Schirmer has married Sepp Vilsmeier and adopted two  Vietnamese children, Hoa and Hou. Anton and Martha have had five children, born between 1945 and 1953.

As Glasisch-Karl finishes talking, it is revealed Maria has died. Family from over the world, including relatives from Brazil, have traveled to Schabbach to pay their respects. Hermann almost misses the funeral and arrives during a thunderstorm during which the town has taken cover away from the rain, leaving Maria's coffin abandoned on the road.

Both Paul and Glasisch-Karl feel unwell during the post-burial meal. An argument erupts when Anton learns Ernst employees had been preparing to plunder the Simon home, following Maria's death. Anton roughly boards the locked house up and posts the key through the letterbox.

While Schabbach prepares its annual festival, Ernst breaks into the family home and reminisces about his past, while Anton stands in the forge, recalling Maria's 70th birthday. Hermann also returns to see the room where he and Klärchen fell in love. The brothers meet in the hallway, and then hear a drilling outside where they discover Paul has fitted a plaque donating the house to the village, as a museum.

During the festival, Anton gets drunk with two young ladies and the locals all dance in a snaking line around the village. Clearly in pain Glasisch-Karl staggers with his walking stick towards the village hall, before collapsing. Standing up straight with a good posture, he walks with unweakened strength towards hall open doors, with a light shining brightly outwards. Inside he is returned to his younger self, and recognises all the since deceased villagers. Maria arrives holding a duvet and walks the room, recollecting the names of the villagers she loved. Katharina, Pauline, Robert, Wilfried, Eduard, Lucie, their Horst, Hans the one-eyed boy and finally her beloved Otto. Glancing out of the window, they all watch as the festival takes place.

Glasisch-Karl's body is discovered and carried inside, so the death does not ruin the mood of the festival. Hermann hears about an old mine shaft that has great acoustics, and later returns to the town to record a piece performed in the atmospheric mine shaft. Listening from a caravan, he listens as a choir perform a piece called 'Geheischnis'.

Die Zweite Heimat

1: "The Time of the First Songs"/"Die Zeit der ersten Lieder" Hermann, 1960 

Enraged by his family's disapproval of his romance with Klärchen, Hermann vows to never fall in love again and to leave the Hunsrück forever and to devote himself to music. In Simmern, he performs a final concert. Marie-Groot and Schnüsschen are in attendance. On the train to Munich he is encouraged by Herr Edel that if he wants to succeed, he needs to free himself from all ideology and to choose good friends. With an introduction letter from his music teacher from Simmern, Karl Schiller, Hermann meets Dr. Bretschneider. Across the street above Frau Moretti's dress shop, she offers him a room that will be vacant in a few weeks time. Until then he leaves his trunk with her for safekeeping. Needing a place to sleep, Dr. Bretschneider assistant, Renate Leineweber lets Hermann sleep in her apartment. She attempts to seduce him, but he resists.

The next morning at the Conservatoire, Hermann passes his viva voce examination. Impressed by Juan Subercasseaux, a Chilean who can speak eleven languages, including music, they quickly become friends. Juan however fails his examination as they viewed his music as folkloric. Herman comforts him as they play music together, Hermann with his guitar and Juan his flute. They attract medical student, Ansgar Herzsprung, who is working as a sound engineer on a New Wave-style film. The film is produced & directed by Stefan Aufhauser, screenplay by Reinhard Dörr and shot by Rob Stürmer. Herr Edel passes and informs them that the Conservatoire used to be the Nazis' Munich headquarters.

On the bus, Hermann bumps into Clemens Bengardt, his old school friend from Hunsrück. Clemens lets him live with him in the coal yard of Kohlen-Josef, who allows them to rehearse in his workshop. Hermann sends for his bicycle, so he can travel around Munich more independently as he feels it is important to quickly know the city. He also takes elocution lessons to erase his rural accent, so he can fit into higher circles.

At the Conservatorie, Hermann sees and becomes attracted to Clarissa Lichtblau, a cellist. Looking for a rehearsal room, he becomes interested by an avant-garde piece of music being performed by senior students, including Volker Schimmelpfennig. He is later even more impressed by their concert they perform along with Clarissa. Hermann's excitement is short lived, as he discovers he has narrowly missed a visit by the now-married Klärchen and he renews his resolve to dissolve all links with his past.

2: "Two Strange Eyes"/"Zwei fremde Augen" Juan, 1960-61 

Juan remains in Munich, even though he failed to secure a place at the Conservatoire. He finds a home for his many talents at the Von Zett Drama School, from suggestion of Hermann. In the need for quick cash they both agree to play at a birthday party for a rich art dealer in the suburbs. At the end of the night, to their disappointment the payment is a bottle of Chateaux Lafite Rothschild 1937.

Ignoring his own advice to Herman to beware of beautiful women, Juan becomes smitten with Clarissa and accompanies her on a trip to visit her Protestant mother, Herr Lichtblau, in Wasserburg. They both realise, like Hermann, each have lost their fathers and have troubled relationships with their mothers. Clarissa practices on the 1749 Italian cello that had been given to her by her mentor, Dr. Kirchmeier. On the train home they both share a kiss, but agree not to fall in love as it is dangerous.

Meanwhile, Hermann becomes enraged as he has discovered his trunk has been stolen. Frau Moretti feels incredibly guilty and begs for his forgiveness. He feels he wants to quit music, but Kohlen-Josef encourages him not to waste his talents.

Needing a job to pay the rent, Hermann and Ansgar find a job disposing of decomposing nitrate film at the Munich Film Archive. They feel a sense of pride when discovering Nazi propaganda reels, as they have history in their hands. After attending a musical performance, the students gather at a bar where Clemen's jazz band is playing. Hermann tries to chat up Clarissa and Juan has made the acquaintance Elisabeth Cerphal, who invites the crowd back to her villa, the Foxholes. Clarissa sings to Volker's piano piece. Renate feels out of place at the party, and Hermann feels insecure with the many talents around him, and later ends up sleeping with her.

Juan is delighted with his first experience of snow. Hermann receives a visit from Karl Schiller, and his mistress and protégée, Marianne Elz. Hermann catches tonsillitis on his weak heart. They both nurse him for a few days. During recovery, Kohlen-Josef urges Hermann to complete his cello concerto and he asks Clarissa to play it. They kiss on the stairs in her apartment block, but Hermann loses his nerve and runs away. Arriving home, he discovers from Clemen's fiancée, Gabi, that Frau Moretti has recovered his trunk. When he collects it, she tells him all artists need to suffer in order to create.

Hermann meets up with Clarissa and Juan as they leave a screening of Stefan and Reinhard's latest film. Clarissa cannot speak as she has tonsillitis. They discover the frozen body of Herr Edel outside the cinema. Clarissa hugs them both, and swears they will be friends forever.

3: "Jealousy and Pride"/"Eifersucht und Stolz" Evelyne, 1961 

After Evelyne Cerphal's father, Arno, dies at the early age of forty-two she discovers that her biological mother is a different woman than she thought, who died in Munich, 1944. Feeling no-longer at home in Neuberg, she leaves for Munich in hope to join the Conservatoire and to search who her real mother was.

Planning to move in with her aunt, Elisabeth Cerphal, Evelyne arrives at Foxholes and recalls a visit from her childhood to the villa. Elisabeth's housekeeper, Frau Reis, informs Evelyne that it was once the centre of Bohemian life in the 1920s-30s. Frau Reis reveals that Evelyne's mother was Lieselotte, a girl from a poor family and Arno's family disapproved of their love.

Elisabeth's financial adviser, Gerold Gattinger, who lives at the Foxholes, pays an interest in an army film projector that Stefan and Rob install there for a private screening of their new film. It was refused a certificate by the censors, and want to have an "anti-premiere" for all their friends. As the guests arrive, Ansgar becomes angry with his girlfriend Olga Müller due to her drug use, and also takes his frustration out on Gattinger, accusing him of being a closet Nazi.

Elisabeth arrives home soon before the film premiere and disapproves of Evelyne arriving unannounced. Frau Reis sets Evelyne up in the library. Hermann becomes jealous of Juan singing with Clarissa, and attempts to make her jealous by creating a musical word play with poet, Helga Aufschrey. Hermann later bickers with Juan and Clarissa about their emotional games they play. Ansgar searches for Olga in the library, but wakens the sleeping Evelyne. He comes enchanted by her voice, and later Evelyne sings along to Hermann and Helga's music piece. Clarissa herself becomes jealous of Hermann's attention towards the other women, and leaves the Foxholes.

Realising he could be losing Clarissa, Hermann scribbles a note confessing his love for her. At her apartment, they bump into one another on the stairs and passionately kiss before being interrupted by a neighbour who escorts Hermann off the premises. Clarissa writes Hermann a letter simply stating she loves him, and leaves to post it with only his name and 'Munich' written on the envelope.

Back at the Foxholes, Juan is looking through photo albums with Elisabeth. She reveals the villa once belonged to her father's Jewish partner, Uncle Goldbaum, until they helped smuggle him out of Germany in 1935. She feels guilty for profiting from his misfortunes, but reveals he did survive the war only to die recently in Israel. Gattinger is uncomfortable hearing about this, and heads out onto the balcony to see Renate performing Shakespeare down below.

The next day, Elisabeth reveals Lieselotte sister, Emmi, is still alive. Ansgar accompanies Evelyne to her Aunt Emmi's dairy shop. Emmi shows Evelyne photographs of Lieselotte, who very closely resembles her daughter. Evelyne then follows her parents footsteps, and while thinking of their love and where she could have been conceived, Ansgar surprises her with his constant negative feelings towards his parents. Yet, she still adores him.

Hermann and Clarissa break into the Foxholes and rehearse a cello concerto, that Hermann wrote for her. It is interrupted by Stefan, Reinhard and Helga who then speaks to Hermann about a poem she wrote that he could put to music. Clarissa leaves and Hermann goes after her. He asks if he can see her the next day, but Clarissa remarks she does not know and to wait for fate.

Meanwhile, Rob and Stefan travel around Munich, slapping 'Papas Kino ist tot' (Dad's Movies are dead) stickers on landmarks throughout the city.

4: "Ansgar's Death"/"Ansgars Tod" Ansgar, 1961-62 

Hermann narrates that Ansgar and Evelyne's love last seven months and four days, until he died. He was the first of them to die, and that perhaps it was always written on him.

Ansgar has taken a job as a tram conductor. Evelyne and himself spend every waking hour together. He waits outside of her singing lessons in chant and oboe and she his medical lectures.

Kohlen-Josef informs Hermann that he was offered a huge sum of money to sell his coalyard. Hermann is disappointed that he'll need to find somewhere else to live. He receives the letter from Clarissa, who he has not seen or heard from in six weeks. It only says "I love you" and Hermann wonders if this was the fate she was talking about as the envelope did not have his address.

Clarissa is back home in Wasserburg. She practices on her cello with her mentor, Dr. Kirchmeier, who takes the moment to confess his undying love for her. Clarissa becomes annoyed with her mother's, constant nagging and tells her of the cello piece written by Hermann that she'll perform in a competition.

At the Conservatoire, Hermann has written a humorous song for Frau Moretti to sing. Their rehearsal is disrupted by Clarissa's return who announces to Hermann she has won the competition using his cello piece and she'll also be traveling to Neuberg soon to perform it. Evelyne writes home to inform her family to attend Clarissa's concert.

Clarissa performs passionately and receives huge praise from the audience. She is photographed and featured in many newspapers, none of which, to Hermann's disappointment, mention him by name as the composer. Hermann reveals he wanted more than a friendship with her, but feels it is now impossible. Clarissa confides in Volker and tells him she is going to abandon the cello.

Ansgar sends Hermann a selection of his poems, which he asks him to set to music after his death as he has burned everything else that reminds him of his past and parents. Ansgar feels smothered by them as they want him to succeed with his poems and paintings. Ansgar feels like a failure, and confesses to Evelyne that he is on drugs and wants to quit medicine.

At the Foxholes, everyone is preparing for a costume party. Dorli, Helga's friend from home helps repair the lights, much to the amazement of the others. Juan and Elisabeth search the attic for costumes and decorations. During the party, Dorli strip teases to Alex, a perpetual philosophy student. Renate and Gattinger arrive together, she is more relaxed with the crowd now. The mood of the party is dampened when Evelyne arrives announcing that Ansgar has been killed, after trapping his foot in a tram door, and it dragged him down the street.

Evelyne return to Ansgar's apartment, to return his clothes. His mother is waiting there and asks Evelyne where all of his paintings, poems and notes are. She replies that he has burned everything.  Unable to accept the fact, Ansgar's mother accuses Evelyne of stealing his clothes and items.

Hermann and Juan visit Ansgar's grave. Hermann feels they have wasted their time in Munich and Juan casually remarks that he will die when he wants to, like Ernest Hemingway, by suicide.

5: "The Game with Freedom"/"Das Spiel mit der Freiheit" Helga, 1962 

Helga states that Corpus Christi Day, 1962 is a day she will never forget. The weather has been very hot for past several days, and a storm is coming.

Hermann is now living the Foxholes, and has been giving piano lessons to young spoilt Tommy, the son of a designer and actress, for almost a year at their penthouse. They invite Hermann along on their family holiday to Sylt, to continue teaching Tommy.

Helga finds herself caught up in a riot, as youths protest against the arrest of three musicians. Hermann is chased by policemen and they destroy his guitar, which is viewed as symbols of nonconformism by the police. Hermann returns to Foxholes and furiously plays the piano. Helga arrives with a wounded wrist and Elisabeth compares the situation to the Nazi era which erupts Hermann's anger. Both students fear for their lives in Munich and wonder why they are staying in Munich, when all their friends are on holiday.

The next day Hermann goes to the local police station and demands compensation for his broken guitar. The police senior suggests they talk with Hermann in another room, but a civilian shouts it is a trap and Hermann escapes after several receiving truncheon blows. Hermann for the first time in two years, decides to leave Munich, hitchhiking a ride for Sylt.

Helga leaves for her family home in Dülmen. She frequently distracts herself from her ultra-conservative family with the company of her friends, Dorli and Marianne Westphal. Passing by to Sylt, Hermann visits Helga and the four retire to Dorli's flat above a cake shop. He plays them Beethoven's 'Sturmsonate'. As they adore the music, the three girls rub ointment onto his back from the injuries he acquired. They start to seduce one another, but it abruptly ends when Helga passes out from the heat.

Helga turns twenty-three the next day and she spends her birthday with her friends. That night Dorli brings a cake in celebration for dinner with Helga's family. Marianne passes Hermann a note which he reads in the bathroom, saying for him to come to her flat later that evening. Helga becomes upset by her family's hypocritical behaviour and crude jokes of the Dorli's cake. Her friends leave, and Helga storms upstairs to her bedroom to be alone with Hermann. They both declare their love for one another and she becomes determined to lose her virginity with him. It is interrupted by Helga's drunken grandmother shouting at her outside to stop. Helga leaves her bedroom, telling Hermann she will be back once her family are asleep. He locks himself in, and climbs out of the window and leaves for Marianne's flat.

Marianne and Hermann have sex. After revealing she is eleven years older than him, Hermann talks about déjà vu. The doorbell rings and a boy passes a letter to Marianne for Hermann, with a note informing they know he is there.

The next morning Marianne drops Hermann outside of town and he hitches a lift to Sylt. In the holiday home of Tommy and his family, Hermann discovers the boy casually looking at nude images of women whilst his nudist parents play fight with towels in the garden. Hermann starts to teach Tommy the piano.

Five weeks later, Hermann returns to Munich. He picks up a new guitar and at the Foxholes is greeted by Alex and his friends, eating a cake sent to him from Helga, Dorli and Marianne. Clarissa sits in the garden with her wrists bandaged up, but does not reveal why when Hermann asks.

6: "Kennedy's Children"/"Kennedys Kinder" Alex, 1963 

Alex wakes on 22 November 1963, a day he'll never forget. Throughout it, he scrounges his friends for money, but none have the time or even money themselves to help him.

Hermann is now in his seventh semester and one of the older students he used to envy. Helga helps him around Munich, putting up posters advertising his first concert outside of the Conservatoire, Spuren, dated 14 December. Hermann notices she is in a mood, but does not question it. She reveals why, reading from her diary about her love Hermann rejects.

While Hermann conducts music, he notices Clarissa listening nearby. He is furious with her as she left unannounced two weeks previous and especially as she had a cello part. Because of her absence, he had to re-write the entire concert. Clarissa asks him for eight-hundred marks, to which he denies as he does not even have enough money for rent. Hermann does not understand why she does not ask Volker or Jean-Marie, as both are from wealthy families.

Now working as a tourist guide, Schnüsschen who now calls herself Waltraud, and turns up at Foxholes looking for Hermann. She is an old friend from the Hunsrück and leaves a letter for him. Alex reads it and is amused she taught Hermann how to kiss. Elisabeth wonders about selling the villa as she has had a generous offer, but says to Alex she'll ask the group, even though they are not round as much anymore. Juan plays the piano and teases Renate about her crush on Hermann. Renate is now at a private drama school.

Volker and Jean-Marie arrive at Clarissa's apartment, both with a bouquet of flowers. Clarissa tells hem she is pregnant and one of them is the father, and does not want to keep the baby due to her studying, career, and that she does not love either one of them. Jean-Marie goes straight to the bank for money to help pay for Clarissa's abortion.

Alex stumbles upon a filming location, and is pleased to see it is a film Stefan, Reinhard and Rob are shooting. While Alex watches them film, he enjoys the free food provided for the cast and crew. The three film-makers argue over creative differences, ending with Stefan and Reinhard storming off set. Waltraud's tour bus goes past and she waves at Alex.

Later, Waltraud bumps into Hermann and Juan at the railway station as they put up posters and they happily reminisce. Clarissa walks through the station and Hermann chases after her, but too late as she already boards a train for Rosenheim.

Alex and Helga arrive upon Olga, who is shooting glamour poses at her own apartment in hope of impressing a producer who will making a film in Rome. Helga rants about her dislike of Munich but Olga dismisses it while she fries eggs for Alex.

Alone and afraid, Clarissa walks through the Rosenheim streets, noticing every odour. She approaches the basement of a doctor and the abortion operation begins.

Renate wanders onto the empty movie set and is offered soup by Bernd, the production manager, who tells her he is unimpressed by the crew's falling out as it is stalling production. Renate auditions for him.

At a phonebox, Alex plans to call his remaining friends to ask for money, but finds a wallet with one-hundred and fifty marks left inside.

Hermann, Juan and Waltraud go to see Cleopatra (1963 film), only for the screening to be interrupted with the news of the Assassination of John F. Kennedy. As people rush to buy newspapers and gather around TV sets in store windows and bars, Alex and Stefan go to break the news to Helga. They discover she has tried to commit suicide by swallowing sleeping pills, but Stefan saves her life. She has little gratitude for his help.

At Foxholes, everyone gathers for the first time in a long while. The film-makers bury their creative differences and Hermann introduces Schnüsschen, Waltraud, to the group.

7: "Christmas Wolves"/"Weihnachtswölfe" Clarissa, 1963 

It has been eleven days since Clarissa's abortion and her tendonitis has flared up again. She visits the Alte Pinakothek but sees her own face in a nun, and feels judged.

Hermann has been trying to persuade Clarissa to perform in his concert, but she does not make a decision. While he prepares in the theatre he wants complete silence and becomes frustrated at a tiny noise from a generator. Waltraud visits him with a gift of a new sweater to wear during his concert. As the audience and Hermann's friends take their seats, Helga, who is now in a relationship with Stefan claims to Hermann she is his widow.

Clarissa becomes deeply unwell and administered into a hospital. Volker and Clarissa's landlady wait at the hospital. The doctors diagnose her with septicaemia, blood poisoning as well as severe anaemia from her abortion.

At Hermann's concert, in order to mock Clarissa's absence he has positioned a topless model with F-holes painted on her back. Evelyne sings a song dedicated to Ansgar.

Juan is at Renate's apartment. They have been having casual sex. Renate admits to him she knows she is a stopgap and that Juan cannot get anywhere in life, just like her. When she asks him if she can become a decent actress, he bluntly replies no and shakes his head when she asks if he believes in her talent.

Hermann invites his friends back to the Foxholes for celebration after the concert, but is very disappointed when no one shows, only Waltraud. They share a kiss and open a bottle of wine from Freuznach, where she visited with her brother Kurt's wife, her favourite sister-in-law.

Volker and Jean-Marie sleep in a car outside of the hospital. It is cold and Jean-Marie suggests they go to Strassberg, but Volker insists on staying by the hospital so he is there for Clarissa.

Hermann and Waltraud have sex. Hermann states he hates all the women at the Conservatoire and they are all uptight with their careers, to which Waltraud suggests the women are Bluestocking women instead. Hermann half suggests himself and Waltraud should marry.

Anxious to make Hermann proud of her looks, Waltraud lets Olga take her to Frau Moretti's cosmetic salon for a makeover. Since Hermann has heard about Clarissa's illness he has wanted to be alone and avoided Waltraud for a few weeks.

Clarissa is now in post-operative intensive car and her mother, Frau Lichtblau, collapses when visiting. Volker gives Clarissa flowers, but her frantic mother believes her daughter is dying.

Jean-Marie lets Volker stay at his grand mansion over Christmas in Strasbourg. Helga and Stefan hike the snowy mountains and stay in a cabin. She mocks the present Stefan has bought for her as Christian consumerism. Stefan becomes frustrated over Helga's mind-games. Later in the evening as they start to have sex, she stops and begins mocking him again, questioning his manhood and bourgeois attitudes. She tells him to have sex with her to quieter her, and after he becomes very angry he attacks her, emptying a wine bottle into her face.

Clarissa is placed in a room with a new mother in the next bed. The woman's husband and two young daughters come to visit and celebrate Christmas together. Clarissa is in an unfestive mood, and cuts off her hair. Clarissa is pleased to see her mother has visited but after Frau Lichtblau calls Clarissa a murderer, Clarissa storms out of the hospital. She hopes to find Volker or Jean-Marie but with no luck. She cries, realising she is alone during Christmas and visits Foxholes, to which sees Hermann alone in the house. Hermann cuts his hand gathering firewood and Clarissa binds the wound with the bandages from her wrists. They huddle together under a blanket by the stove, but she is hurt when Hermann declares his love for Waltraud and they will marry in the Spring. She settles on the sofa in the library before creeping back in and crawl's into Hermann's bed. They both cry in each other's arms about why they always reject each other's passion. Hermann asks her if she would marry him, but she declines and they lie together in a mournful silence.

The next morning as Hermann plays his guitar, Clarissa sings a song about wolves that only exist in tenderness and not love.

8: "The Wedding"/"Die Hochzeit" Schnüsschen, 1964 

It is New Year's Eve, 1963 and Waltraud spends Christmas at home in the Hunsrück. She is emotionally proud to be home and with her family. When asked if there is a man in her life, she only hints at it. Waltraud leaves the next day for Munich.

Juan has been away for three weeks with Renate and her family. Waltraud meets Juan in the park and asks why does he learn languages when he does not visit their countries. Juan responds that he is known for his languages like Stefan, Reinhard and Rob have their film company. But unlike them, no one would notice if he disappears. Waltraud promises Juan can always turn to her.

Waltraud and Hermann baby-sit Waltraud's colleague, Elisabeth's children in her grand apartment. Waltraud confesses she has centered her life around Hermann. While Elisabeth's children are sleeping, Waltraud and Hermann have sex. When one of the children, Raoul, wakes up Waltraud sees to him. Hermann shrugs off to himself his comment years before about never to love again.

Clarissa travels to Paris on the Orient Express and dreams of Hermann, while he dreams of her. In Paris, Clarissa performs an emotional aggressive piece on her cello.

While working, Waltraud gets off her tour bus by the Foxholes for a quick visit to Hermann, but all of the tourists soon follow believing the house to be an attraction. Waltraud improvises and gives them a quick tour of the downstairs until Elisabeth takes over and escorts them all outside, giving them a brief history of the house. She says Hitler never set foot in the house when a tourist asks. Waltraud tells Hermann she has booked an appointment to see an apartment for them both, but they only accept married couples so they will have to pretend to be one.

At the apartment Waltraud and Hermann pretend to be a soon-to-wed couple, and after being offered it they celebrate by visiting an expensive restaurant. They mildly complain to one another at the lack of food and high price. Afterwards they go back to the Foxholes and Hermann asks Waltraud to marry him, and she emotionally accepts.

It is the day of Hermann and Waltraud's wedding, July 22, 1964. Pauline Kröber, Marie-Goot Schirmer and Pauline's granddaughter, Jacqueline travel to Munich.

Pauline, Marie-Goot and Jacqueline arrive at Foxholes and meet Frau Ries, who tells them it is better to stay at the villa than head to the registry office now for wedding. Everyone arrives at the Foxholes. Renate arrives with Herr Alois Brettschneider and says she has moved in with him. Juan is with Annikki, who teaches German. Pauline has brought 14 carat rings for Hermann and Waltraud and says their son Robertchen has taken over the family jewellery shop.

In the dining room, Stefan swaps his name tag on the table with Juan’s girlfriend, Annikki, so he does not have to sit next to Helga. Evelyne arrives at the Foxholes with her African boyfriend. Marie-Goot has money for Hermann as a gift, but he refuses to take it during dinner. Helga swaps seats with Annikki so she sits next to Stefan. Annikki is now sat by Rob, who flirts with her. Jean-Marie flirts with a waitress. Pauline tells Marie-Goot about all the musicians, filmmakers and actresses in the room that Juan told her about, and none of them rely on Hermann. Juan listens silently to the conversation.

Outside the villa, Volker conducts a brass band. Helga becomes attracted to one of the musicians, Vladmir who later have rough sex. Stefan becomes drunk after seeing them both through a window. Juan sits in the garden lost in thought, unimpressed by the music. Rob is still flirting with Annikki.

Volker plays the piano and Jean-Marie sings a fast-paced love song and Renate sings a song about tango while Bernd admires her. Waltraud shows Hermann the French kiss she once taught him. Eyes closed, tongue out. Vladmir and Helga talk about life and Stefan taunts her. Vladmir pushes Stefan back who knocks into Reinhard, causing him to spill his drink. Elisabeth and Rolf argue as they leave with their kids for home.

Clarissa arrives late at the party, after receiving a scholarship from a distracted Californian maestro. Waltraud and Hermann head for their new apartment alone.

Volker says he will miss Clarissa who is leaving for America in a months time. Volker asks if she will spend a weekend with him, and she agrees reluctantly. Volker claims she thinks of Hermann still, but she responds she does not. Clarissa throws her food bowl and laughs in hysterics, then starts crying.

Olga plays with Reinhard’s rifle, before they leaving it on the window sill.

While all of the gang are dancing, there is a sudden gunshot. They all see Reinhard pull the rifle off Juan, with a bloody arm. Juan screams to be left alone. Reinhard tells the others Juan tried to kill himself. Clarissa cradles Juan, crying as she did not even know he was at the party. Stefan shouts at Reinhard for having the rifle in the first place. Stefan and Reinhard fight. Elisabeth stops them, telling them not to fight on her property and it has gone too far. Elisabeth is disappointed in Juan at his suicide attempt, especially because with his many talents he'd have wasted. Rob apologises for flirting with Annika and says they were only fooling around. Volker tells Clarissa he loves her and she tells him to never mention it again. Olga is upset that the men talk about everything except themselves. Alex screams at Juan, as suicide is against everything Alex believes. Stefan aims the rifle at Helga but Elisabeth snatches it off him, he says he was joking, but Elisabeth screams for everyone to get out, and she never wants to see them again as everyone has disappointed her.

9: "The Eternal Daughter"/"Die ewige Tochter" Fräulein Cerphal, 1965 

Elisabeth has allowed Juan to stay with her at the Foxholes, where he keeps himself occupied laying a mosaic of an Inca god in the garden. Frau Reis is concerned that Herr Cerphal, Elisabeth's father, is dying. Elisabeth visits her father at the hospital, stealing flowers from outside and proudly tells her father about her audacity. Elisabeth tells him that Evelyne has become a real artist and will be singing at the Parisian Opera soon. Herr Cerphal gives Elisabeth the key to his office at Cerphal Publishing, which he once owned and orders her to bring him a brown envelope from the safe. Aware that her father's office holds dark secrets, she attempts to enter the premises at night but becomes arrested after being caught.

Juan and Alex drop into Renate's U-boat club, where she performs a cabaret number. Bernd works there too and Stefan and his film editor Fraulein Dagmar are also in attendance. The mood becomes sour as Helga arrives, informing Stefan she is pregnant by Vladimir.

Hermann has not seen his friends in months, and now had a baby with Waltraud called Simone, but Hermann calls her Lulu. They live in a cramped apartment with their lodger, Herr Roo. Waltraud frequently asks Hermann if they are preventing him from composing, but Hermann insists he is satisfied with life.

Juan arrives back to the Foxholes as police men escort Elisabeth home. Elisabeth fears she will lose everything she loves and claims she has never seen a dead body, not even in the war, to which Juan says maybe she will soon.

Upon arriving back to Germany from America, Clarissa is greeted at the airport by her mother and Dr. Kirchmeier. Clarissa discovers her cello has broken during the flight and weeps. Dr. Kirchmeier assures her it will be fixed and perhaps it will sound better than ever.

Hermann visits the Conservatoire to collect his diploma, but uses it to keep the rain off himself as he leaves.

Elisabeth visits Cerphal Publishing again and is greeted by Herr Von Beck, Dr. Leierseder the senior editor, and Dr. Riebe the legal expert. They have found a document which gives only Herr Cerphal and members of his family access to his office at all times. Alone in her father's office, Elisabeth opens the safe and finds old photos, including one of her father in Nazi Party uniform. She also finds a photograph of her best friend Edith Goldbaum, who Elisabeth believes died in the Dachau concentration camp, after being sent off in 1943. Elisabeth wonders if her father smuggled Uncle Goldbaum to Switzerland. Returning to the Foxholes, she confessed to Juan she has erased the past twenty years in her memory due to being ashamed of what happened during them.

Back at the hospital Herr Cerphal tells Elisabeth to rip apart a document which he claims in a sham contract. He tells her that if anyone tries to take claim of the Foxholes she has to kick them out. Questioning who he might mean, Herr Cerphal tells Elisabeth if it is any of the Goldbaum's relatives. Herr Cerphal tells Elisabeth to finish her studies. He struggles to write his will, as his right hand is paralysed.

Clarissa and her mother attend a concert with Volker at a piano. Jean-Marie conducting. Juan goes to Hermann’s apartment, seeing Hermann happily play with Lulu. After peaking into the concert Juan stands outside of the restaurant where Volker, Clarissa, Jean-Marie and Frau Lichtbeau are having dinner.

Elisabeth enquires into doing a course that will impress her father before he dies. She discussed with Juan how her father took the Goldbaum’s house, the Foxholes, during war and how he claimed he would give it back after, which he did not. Elisabeth reminisces about her deceased brothers, Peter and Arno and how her father called her the ‘grace note’. Something that is not essential. Juan claims that Elisabeth knew her best friend would die and that she always knew whose house it was. Juan also claims Elisabeth loved Herr Gattinger. Elisabeth cries alone in her room.

Clarissa goes with Volker to get the cello fixed. Bumping into Waltraud, she introduces baby Simone to her, now four months old. Alex ponders the philosophy of how to enter Foxholes legally, while Helga herself breaks in with friends.

At 12:30am, at her father's office, Elisabeth accidentally fires her father's revolver into his chair. Arriving back to the Foxholes at 2am, Elisabeth discovers Helga leading a group of student protesters, wanting to co-ordinate a plan of action against the government's proposed Emergency Laws. Elisabeth confronts Helga, but Helga asserts it was similar bourgeois complacency that allowed the Nazis to seize power. Frau Reis announces Herr Cerphal died at 12:30am. Elisabeth realises that was the same time she fired the gun and feeling somehow culpable, orders the students to leave.

On 23 August 1965, Elisabeth with Gattinger, show a conveyancer around at the Foxholes. The council want to buy the land and build 150 flats in its place. Elisabeth realises it will bury her guilt, and they are offered enough money for rest of life and to travel the world.

Juan puts the finishing touches on his mosaic.

10: "The End of the Future"/"Das Ende der Zukunft" Reinhard, 1966

11: "Time of Silence"/"Die Zeit des Schweigens" Rob, 1967-68

12: "A Time of Many Words"/"Die Zeit der vielen Worte" Stefan, 1968-69

13: "Art or Life"/"Kunst oder Leben" Hermann & Clarissa, 1970

Heimat 3

Heimat Fragments

Home from Home

References

Lists of German television series episodes